Pertti Pauli llmari Palmroth (August 12, 1931 – March 29, 2020) was a Finnish shoe designer and shoe manufacturer specialized in the design of high quality women's shoes and boots.

Career 
Pertti Palmroth was born in 1931 in Pirkkala. His parents were shoe manufacturer Pentti Palmroth and his wife Alli Mandell. With the objective to learn the technical side of footwear, Pertti and his older brother Juhani Palmroth travelled to Northampton, UK, where they both graduated as footwear technicians. After England, they studied one year in Technische Schuhfachschule von Pirmasens in Germany In England Pertti Palmroth was impressed by the world of haute couture and he decided to specialize in the design of high quality women's shoes and boots.

After they came back to Finland Pertti Palmroth began designing women's shoes and boots in his fathers factory. At the age of 21 he designed his first own shoe in the autumn of 1952 for the Miss Universum contestant Miss Finland Armi Kuusela. Armi Kuusela was that year the first Finnish contestant to win the Miss Universe title. After the victory the Viva sandals became a hit in Finland. In the early 1960s Pertti Palmroth took his collection that was made in his fathers factory and travelled to Sweden, France, the US and Canada and many other countries. At the time it was a risky venture. But the collection was received well, Products were sold to designer Christian Dior in Paris, appeared in the US Vogue and the shoes were sold in department stores like Bloomingdales, Bergdorf Goodman, Saks Fifth Avenue, Harrods and many boutiques all over Europe and North America.

A new factory was built in Waalwijk in the Netherlands for the international market, and it served as a base for the sales to Western Europe and North America.

After his father Pentti Palmroth died in the fall of 1968, the two sons Juhani and Pertti ran the factories together, but later decided to divide the factories. In 1969 Pertti Palmroth began his work as CEO of Hämeen kenkätehdas Oy (later Hamken Oy) and built a new shoe factory in Tampere. In 1972 he created a brand called Palmroth Original. From 1976 onwards his designs were sold under the Pertti Palmroth label. He used his signature as his brand logo. His wife Hannele also worked with him in the company and designed hand bags. The shoes were sold to places like Bloomingdales in New York.

In the beginning of the 1980s he opened a shoe factory in Virrat. In 1985 he opened a store in Helsinki and the next year he started as CEO of the Pertti Palmroth Oy store chain which opened stores in Sweden, Norway, Netherlands and Germany. Palmroth's designs were featured in foreign magazines like Elle, Vogue and Harper's Bazaar. Some Palmroth models were copied by other factories.

In 1995 Hamken Oy expanded with a new factory in Pirkkala.to produce the new waterproof collection.

In 2000 Pertti Palmroth headed a design team that consisted of his wife Hannele, shoe designer Anu Haalahti and several other members. The factories in Tampere, Virrat and Pirkkala employed about 250 persons. Exports accounted for about 60–70 percent of production and the biggest markets were in Scandinavia and North America. There were 23 brand stores globally.

In 2004, at the age of 72, Pertti Palmroth left his position as CEO of both Hamken and Pertti Palmroth Oy and an external CEO was hired to continue. Pertti Palmroth continued working as the main designer. The chain had a dozen stores in Finland.

In 2007, the factory underwent a corporate restructuring due to financial losses and debt. Early 2008, son Mikko continued as the company's CEO and daughter Petrina as the operative of the domestic store chain. The restructuring program was unable to avoid Hamken Oy and its subsidiary Pertti Palmroth Oy closing the shoe factory and the bag factory as well as the stores in 2011. The Palmroth brand was restarted under a new company name, Palmroth International, founded in 2012 and headed by son Mikko Palmroth who has made shoes in Finland and Portugal since 2012.

Palmroth died in 2020 in neighboring Tampere at the age of 88.

Acknowledgments 

 Coupe D'or du Bon Gout Francais -prize in 1965 in France
 The Internationalization Award of the President of Finland (Tasavallan Presidentin kansainvälistymispalkinto) in 1980

Private life 
Pertti Palmroth was married twice, in 1952–1986 to Marja-Leena Miettinen and in 1988–2020 to Hannele Paasonen. He had seven children. Most of his life he lived in Pirkkala.

References 

1931 births
2020 deaths
Finnish fashion designers
People from Pirkkala